Urbano (Urban) is the fourth studio album by Elvis Crespo.

Track listing
 "La Cerveza"
 "A Medias"
 "Bandida"
 "Báilalo" 
 "Bésame En La Boca"
 "Ojos Negros"
 "Que Se Repita"
 "Para Mí"
 "Oh La La"
 "Amarte Así"
 "Poco A Poco"
 "Como Fingir" (Unplugged)
 "Te Lo Digo Yo"
 "Señora Tambora" (A Dúo Con Sergio Vargas)

Sales and certifications

See also
List of number-one Billboard Tropical Albums from the 2000s

References 

Elvis Crespo albums
2002 albums